The meridian 103° west of Greenwich is a line of longitude that extends from the North Pole across the Arctic Ocean, North America, the Pacific Ocean, the Southern Ocean, and Antarctica to the South Pole.

In the United States, the border between New Mexico and Oklahoma is defined by the meridian.

The 103rd meridian west forms a great circle with the 77th meridian east.

From Pole to Pole
Starting at the North Pole and heading south to the South Pole, the 103rd meridian west passes through:

{| class="wikitable plainrowheaders"
! scope="col" width="130" | Co-ordinates
! scope="col" | Country, territory or sea
! scope="col" | Notes
|-
| style="background:#b0e0e6;" | 
! scope="row" style="background:#b0e0e6;" | Arctic Ocean
| style="background:#b0e0e6;" |
|-
| 
! scope="row" | 
| Nunavut — Ellef Ringnes Island and Thor Island
|-
| style="background:#b0e0e6;" | 
! scope="row" style="background:#b0e0e6;" | Maclean Strait
| style="background:#b0e0e6;" |
|-
| style="background:#b0e0e6;" | 
! scope="row" style="background:#b0e0e6;" | Unnamed waterbody
| style="background:#b0e0e6;" |
|-
| 
! scope="row" | 
| Nunavut — Cameron Island, Île Vanier, Massey Island and Alexander Island
|-
| style="background:#b0e0e6;" | 
! scope="row" style="background:#b0e0e6;" | Austin Channel
| style="background:#b0e0e6;" |
|-
| style="background:#b0e0e6;" | 
! scope="row" style="background:#b0e0e6;" | Parry Channel
| style="background:#b0e0e6;" | Viscount Melville Sound
|-valign="top"
| style="background:#b0e0e6;" | 
! scope="row" style="background:#b0e0e6;" | M'Clintock Channel
| style="background:#b0e0e6;" | Passing just west of  Prince of Wales Island, Nunavut,  (at )
|-
| 
! scope="row" | 
| Nunavut — Victoria
|-
| style="background:#b0e0e6;" | 
! scope="row" style="background:#b0e0e6;" | Queen Maud Gulf
| style="background:#b0e0e6;" |
|-valign="top"
| 
! scope="row" | 
| Nunavut Northwest Territories — from  Saskatchewan — from 
|-valign="top"
| 
! scope="row" | 
| North Dakota South Dakota — from  Nebraska — from  Colorado — from  New Mexico / Oklahoma border — from  Texas — from 
|-valign="top"
| 
! scope="row" | 
|-
| style="background:#b0e0e6;" | 
! scope="row" style="background:#b0e0e6;" | Pacific Ocean
| style="background:#b0e0e6;" |
|-
| style="background:#b0e0e6;" | 
! scope="row" style="background:#b0e0e6;" | Southern Ocean
| style="background:#b0e0e6;" |
|-
| 
! scope="row" | Antarctica
| Unclaimed territory
|-
| style="background:#b0e0e6;" | 
! scope="row" style="background:#b0e0e6;" | Southern Ocean
| style="background:#b0e0e6;" | Amundsen Sea
|-
| 
! scope="row" | Antarctica
| Unclaimed territory
|-
|}

See also
102nd meridian west
104th meridian west

w103 meridian west
Borders of Oklahoma
Borders of New Mexico